Lisa Zimmermann may refer to:

 Lisa Zimmermann (skier) (born 1996), German freestyle skier
 Lisa Zimmermann (gymnast) (born 2003), German artistic gymnast
 Lisa Cole Zimmerman (born 1969), American soccer player